The Glasgow Police Act 1800 was an Act of Parliament passed by the Parliament of Great Britain, which established a professional police force for the city of Glasgow. Under the Act, this police force was placed under the control of the Lord Provost, three magistrates and nine elected commissioners. The force was supported financially by a rate levied by the City Council on houses and businesses; the lack of such a levy had frustrated the previous attempt at having a professional police presence in the city. 

The Act was a forerunner of similar Acts of Parliament establishing police forces in other Scottish cities and burghs, culminating in the Policing of Towns (Scotland) Act 1850 and the General Police and Improvement (Scotland) Act 1862.

As well as making provision for the establishment of a police force, the Act also authorised the annexation of ninety-six acres of land surrounding the city.

References

Great Britain Acts of Parliament 1800
History of Glasgow
1800 in Scotland
18th century in Glasgow